Tommy Robredo defeated Nikolay Davydenko 6–2, 6–1 to win the 2006 Swedish Open singles event.

Seeds

Draw

Finals

Section 1

Section 2

External links
 Main draw
 Qualifying draw

Swedish Open
2006 ATP Tour
Swedish